Dot in Space is a 1994 Australian animated film, featuring Dot from Dot and the Kangaroo animated film series. While the previous films in the series were screened in the United States, Dot in Space seldom makes any releases outside its home country.

Plot
Dot decides to rescue Whyka, the Russian space dog, who is circling the earth trapped in a broken down satellite. After making her way into the space lab's complex, Dot trades with the space monkey Buster, then pilots an American rocket and sets a course to rescue Whyka. After the successful rescue, they both end up stranded on an alien planet, where a dictator named Papa Drop rules over people who are perfectly round in shape (called the Roundies) and ostracises people who do not have this perfection. Dot makes her escape and helps 'The Party' (In fact Papa's defective son Rolly) to turn the Roundies army against Papa and enable everyone, no matter their shape, to live a peaceful coexistence once more. With this business finished, Dot and Whyka get back in their rocket and return to Earth.

Cast
 Robyn Moore - Dot, Dosey Face, Poley, Misc.
 Keith Scott - Grumblebones, Buster, Papa Drop, Roley, Professor Globus, Inflato, Sergeant, Soldiers, Misc.

Cancelled U.S. release
Unlike the previous Dot films, many American distributors declined distribution rights of Dot in Space for the North American release on any format, nor was it even released anywhere outside its home country.

References

External links

Dot in Space at Yoram Gross Films

1994 films
1990s Australian animated films
1990s children's animated films
1990s English-language films
Animated films about dogs
Animated films about extraterrestrial life
Australian animated feature films
Australian children's adventure films
Films directed by Yoram Gross
1990s Australian films
Flying Bark Productions films